Allan Rennie (born 26 October 1960) is a retired Scottish amateur football centre back who made over 120 appearances in the Scottish League for Queen's Park. He also played for Clydebank and Queen of the South.

Honours 
Queen's Park
 Scottish League Second Division: 1980–81

References

Scottish footballers
Scottish Football League players
Queen's Park F.C. players
Association football central defenders
1960 births
Footballers from Glasgow
Clydebank F.C. (1965) players
Kilbirnie Ladeside F.C. players
Queen of the South F.C. players
Living people
Scottish Junior Football Association players